The 1st Edward Jancarz Memorial was the 1992 version of the Edward Jancarz Memorial. It took place on 12 July in the Stal Gorzów Stadium in Gorzów Wielkopolski, Poland. The Memorial was won by Hans Nielsen who beat Jarosław Szymkowiak and Bohumil Brhel.

Heat details 
 12 July 1992 (Sunday)
 Best Time: 65.25 - Bohumil Brhel in Heat 1
 Attendance: ?
 Referee: Roman Siwiak

See also 
 motorcycle speedway
 1992 in sports

References

External links 
 (Polish) Stal Gorzów Wlkp. official webside

Memorial
1992
Edward Jancarz
Edward Jancarz Memorial